Senator Funk may refer to:

Frank H. Funk (1869–1940), Illinois State Senate
Isaac Funk (1797–1865), Illinois State Senate
LaFayette Funk (1834–1919), Illinois State Senate

See also
Rich Funke (born 1949), New York State Senate